Pung Island (Pungdo) is a small populated island on the Yellow Sea, located in within the municipal borders of Ansan city, Gyeonggi Province, South Korea, about 74 km South West of Seoul, the country's capital town, and 24 km south of the larger Daebudo island.

Naval battle of Pungdo took place in the vicinity of the island in July 1894. The island had some military strategic importance, as it is sitting next to the two navigable channels out of the Bay of Asan.

See also
Islands of Korea

References

Islands of Gyeonggi Province
Islands of the Yellow Sea